Mordellistena anomala is a beetle in the genus Mordellistena of the family Mordellidae. It was described in 1968 by Ermisch.

References

anomala
Beetles described in 1968